The South Grenville Rangers are a junior ice hockey team based in Prescott, Ontario. They play in the National Capital Junior Hockey League.

History 
On April 24, 2017, a franchise was awarded to Prescott, Ontario to start play in the 2017-18 season along with three other new franchises. Their home arena would be the Leo Boivin Community Centre.

On February 24, 2018, the Rangers would play their first playoff game against the Papineau Vikings. The team lost the series 4-0.

On August 21, 2019, the team's home arena would be shut down due to an ammonia leak in the ice plant, forcing the team to move to the Ingredion Centre in Cardinal, Ontario.

On February 17, 2019, the team became the East Division champions for the first time in franchise history.

On February 23, 2019, the team made the playoffs two years in a row.

On March 1, 2019, the team won their first playoff series 4-0.

Season-by-season record 
Note: GP = Games Played, W = Wins, L = Losses, T = Ties, OTL = Overtime Losses, GF = Goals for, GA = Goals against

References

External links 
 South Grenville Rangers
 NCJHL website

Eastern Ontario Junior C Hockey League teams
Ice hockey teams in Ontario
Ice hockey clubs established in 2017
2017 establishments in Ontario